Aldo Francia (1923–1996) was a Chilean filmmaker.

Filmography
 Valparaíso mi amor (1969)
 Ya no basta con rezar (1973)

References

External links

1923 births
1996 deaths
Chilean film directors